Albert Dauzat (4 July 1877 – 31 October 1955) was a French linguist specializing in toponymy and onomastics.

Dauzat, a student of Jules Gilliéron, was a director of studies at the École des hautes études.

Works
 L'argot des poilus; dictionnaire humoristique et philologique du langage des soldats de la grande guerre de 1914, 1918
 La géographie linguistique, 1922
 Les noms de lieux, origine et évolution; villes et villages--pays--cours d'eau--montagnes--lieux-dits, 1926
 La Langue Française: sa vie, son évolution, 1926 
 Les argots : caractères, évolution, influence, 1928
 Le génie de la langue française, 1942
 Grammaire raisonnée de la langue française, 1947
 Dictionnaire étymologique des noms de famille et prénoms de France, 1951

References

Bibliography 
 {{lang|fr|Colloque Albert Dauzat et le patrimoine linguistique auvergnat, Thiers, 5-6-7 novembre 1998 : actes (colloque organisé par le parc naturel régional Livradois-Forez), coédition Parc naturel régional Livradois-Forez (Saint-Gervais-sous-Meymont), CNRS (Montpellier) et CRDP d’Auvergne (Clermont-Ferrand)|italic=unset}}, 2000, 255, . — .
 Anne-Marguerite Fryba-Reber, Dauzat et Jaberg : deux héritiers de Gilliéron, in Actes du Colloque Dauzat et le patrimoine linguistique auvergnat, Montpellier, 2000, 211-230
 Joan Pèire Chambon (=Jean-Pierre Chambon), Albert Dauzat [H. Stammerjohann (1996) Lexicon grammaticorum. Who’s Who in the History of World Linguistics,'' Tübingen, ]

People from Guéret
1877 births
1955 deaths
Linguists from France
Toponymists
Onomastics